Ilanji Vel is one among the ancient velirs of the Yadu Kingdom. He ruled a territory called Ilanji, near Courtallam.
He belongs to the clan of ancient Pandyas. In 2003, a cave engraving has been found revealing the facts about Ilanji Vel and his ancestry. From the inscription it says illanji king was son of great paravan. This paravars today live in coastal belt who got converted to Christianity in 1530s. Hence this inscription concludes or gives vivid picture that pandiyan lineage should be from Paravars. The inscription says, "Ilanji Vel,Maa paravan Magan nal mazhukkai kodupithavan", (" Ilanji Vel, the son of a great Paravar headman has given this auspicious cave dwelling.")

References

Year of birth missing
Year of death missing
 
Tamil history
Tamil monarchs